Petrus Comestor, also called Pierre le Mangeur (died 22 October 1178), was a twelfth-century French theological writer and university teacher.

Life 

Petrus Comestor was born in Troyes. Although the name Comestor (Latin for 'eater', le Mangeur in French) was popularly attributed to his habit of devouring books and learning, it was probably, and more prosaically, a family name. It did, however, give Peter a nice pun for his epitaph (supposed to have been composed by him): Petrus eram quem petra tegit,/ dictusque Comestor nunc comedor (I was Peter, whom this stone covers,/ called 'devourer', now I am devoured). (For a text of it, see Petrus Comestor.)

As a young man, Peter studied at Troyes Cathedral school, where he might have come into contact with Peter Abelard.; sometime later, he was a student in Paris under, amongst others, Peter Lombard. By 1147, he was back in Troyes, having been appointed dean of Troyes Cathedral. By 1160, Peter had returned to Paris to teach, holding the chair of theology at the university (from which he retired in 1169). He was made chancellor of Notre Dame in Paris around 1164, which put him, amongst other things, in charge of the cathedral school, and which post he held until his death in 1178. Peter's reputation as an academic was such that Pope Alexander III exempted Peter from his ban on charging fees for giving licences to teach.

Peter was buried in the Abbey of Saint Victor, and he may have retired and become a canon there; he was celebrated as such by the canons in their necrology.

Works

Historia Scholastica
Peter's most famous work was his Historia Scholastica: as Beryl Smalley called it, a 'great study of biblical history'. The Historia was completed by 1173, Peter having spent some time writing it at the Abbey of Saint Victor. Peter dedicated it to William, bishop of Sens. The Historia was a core text during the following centuries, even being a source, perhaps, for The Canterbury Tales.

Other works
Many of Peter's works are still unpublished.  Among his works are:
 Sermons: 50 are in Migne PL, misattributed to Hildebert of Lavardin (PL clxxi, 330-964, others in PL cxcviii, 1721-1844). The precise number of Peter's sermons is not entirely agreed upon.
 Liber de Sacramentis
 De Poenitentia
 Breviarum Sententiarum
 Glosses on the Gospels, the Glossa Ordinaria, the Psalter, St Paul, and the Twelve Minor Prophets
 Sententiae de Sacramentis, an abridgement of Peter Lombard's Sentences
 Treatises on the Eucharist and on Confession
 Questiones

Editions 
 Petris Comestoris Scolastica Historia: Liber Genesis. Edited by Agneta Sylwan. Turnhout: Brepols, 2004, Pp. xc + 227. (Corpus Christianorum Continuatio Mediaevalis, 191).

Manuscripts

Historia scolastica 
 Épinal, Bibliothèque municipale, ms. 50 s. xiii
 British Library, Harley MS 4132. s. xiii. 
 British Library, Egerton MS 272.  s. xiii.
 Durham Cathedral, B.III.20. s. xiii. 
 Hereford Cathedral, P.v.15. s. xiii in.
 Lincoln Cathedral, 80. s. xii. 
 Lincoln Cathedral, 86. s. xiii

Other works 
 Hereford Cathedral, O.vii.3. Sermones s. xiii in.
 Oxford, Bodleian Library, MS. Bodley 494. Textus glosatus super Iohannem etc. s. xii/xiii. H.
 Oxford, Bodleian Library, MS. Bodley 748. Petrus Comestor s. xiv.
 Oxford, Corpus Christi College 159. Peter Comestor s. xiv in.
 Lincoln Cathedral, 153. s. xii ex.
 Lincoln Cathedral, 159. s. xiv/xv.

Notes

Further reading 
 M. J. Clark, The Making of the Historia scholastica, 1150–1200 (Studies and Texts, 198), Pontifical Institute of Medieval Studies, 2016
 Gilbert Dahan, Les Intellectuels chrétiens et les Juifs au Moyen Âge, Paris, Cerf, 1990.
 B. Smalley, The Study of the Bible in the Middle Ages, 2nd edn., University of Notre Dame Press, 1964
 D. Luscombe, “The Place of Peter Comestor in the History of Medieval Theology,” in Pierre le Mangeur ou Pierre de Troyes, maître du XIIe siècle, ed. Gilbert Dahan, Brepols, 2013, 27–45

External links 

 
Guide to Petrus, Comestor, Historia scholastica. Manuscript, 12-- at the University of Chicago Special Collections Research Center
Guide to Petrus, Comestor, Historia scholastica. Manuscript, 13-- at the University of Chicago Special Collections Research Center
 Medieval Libraries of Great Britain
 "Pierre le Mangeur"
 "Peter Comestor", Catholic Encyclopedia

Year of birth unknown
1170s deaths
12th-century French historians
12th-century French Catholic theologians
Chancellors of the University of Paris
Medieval Paris
Writers from Troyes
French male writers
12th-century Latin writers